The Sheffield City Council elections were held on 8 May 1969, with one third of the council - plus a double vacancy in Park - up for election. The previous year's historic win by the Conservatives, and their gaining control of the council was ended with these elections, with Labour successfully holding or gaining back seats in wards they lost in the last year's defeat. The previous year's substantial Tory leads in vote figures and seat numbers belied how narrowly won those numerous gains were, with even a tiny swing to Labour destined to return them.

Labour's win and regaining control of the council was in sharp contrast to the national picture, which seen a repeat of the preceding years' heavy losses to the Conservatives with further losses of their heartlands to Tory control. Sheffield joined Stoke as the only cities left controlled by Labour, with last year's survivor Hull falling this year. Nationally Labour managed just 23 gains, with Sheffield accounting for over a fifth of them.

Given this environment, the Labour response was naturally overjoyed; the Sheffield Brightside MP Eddie Griffiths reacted "I literally had tears in my eyes when I heard the results. I was more excited about these results than by my own election". The Labour group's leader Ald Ron Ironmonger attributed this to their campaigning effort and the electorate voting on a local mindset "[we've] struggled so hard for this. We took this really seriously - we haven't fought a campaign like this for years. I think the victory is due to the good sense of the Sheffield people, and I am proud of them tonight. They have judged the election on the city's own affairs as we asked them to. We are certainly wiser men after a year in opposition. There is no doubt about that."

The Conservative grouping leader Ald Harrold Hebblethwaite responded "Obviously I am very disappointed at this result and I find it quite surprising, though one has always understood that Sheffield is a city on its own, and can never be relied on to follow a national trend. The great pity of it is that Walkley we certainly lost due to the intervention of an Independent, and Sharrow by a Liberal intervention - though obviously we cannot say that as regards Firth Park and Handsworth".

Hebblethwaite accepted that the Rent Rebate scheme had played a large part in last year's results, but qualified "nevertheless I am certain the public have been somewhat confused about the issues this year. Twelve months is not enough time for any party to settle down in control and get its policies under way". Of such policies Labour were to reintroduce the closed-shop clause in Corporation employment which the Tories had dropped and accept the 30 places at Sheffield Girl's High School, which were now too late to reverse.

Overall turnout was up narrowly on the previous year's, to 33.2%

Election result

The result had the following consequences for the total number of seats on the Council after the elections:

Ward results

References

Sheffield
Sheffield City Council elections
City Council election, 1969
Sheffield City Council election